Antonio Sacchi (1708–1788) was an Italian improvisational actor, renowned for his performance as the Commedia dell'arte stock character Truffaldino. Sacchi's lasting influence was in requesting playwright Carlo Goldoni to lay a dramatic structure to his improvised routines, with the resulting plays Truffaldino's 32 Mishaps (1738–40), Truffaldino's Son Lost and Found (1746), and the masterpiece A Servant of Two Masters (1745–53) being the best permanent record of what was an impromptu and momentary art form. Sacchi toured throughout Europe with his own Commedia troupe from 1738 to 1753, and both David Garrick and Casanova spoke highly of his talents.

References 

18th-century Italian male actors
Commedia dell'arte
1708 births
1788 deaths